The Saint Peter's Peacocks are the sixteen intercollegiate athletic teams that representing Saint Peter's University, located in Jersey City, New Jersey. The Peacocks compete in the NCAA Division I and are members of the Metro Atlantic Athletic Conference.

Teams 
A member of the Metro Atlantic Athletic Conference (MAAC), Saint Peter's sponsors teams in eight men's and eight women's NCAA sanctioned sports:

Men's intercollegiate sports
 Baseball (go to Peacocks baseball)
 Basketball (go to Peacocks basketball)
 Cross Country
 Golf 
 Soccer 
 Swimming & Diving
 Track & Field (Indoor & Outdoor)

Women's intercollegiate sports
 Basketball (go to basketball)
 Cross Country
 Soccer
 Softball
 Swimming & Diving
 Track & Field (Indoor & Outdoor)
 Volleyball

Discontinued teams

Football

The Peacocks football program ran from 1971 to 2006.

Tennis
The Peacocks men's and women's tennis team were discontinued in 2018.

Women's bowling
The Peacocks women's bowling team was discontinued following the 2017-18 season.

References

External links
 

Saint Peter's Peacocks
Saint Peter's University